Wilson Joel Escalante Paniagua (born 6 May 1977) is a Bolivian football manager and former player who played as a defender. He played in three matches for the Bolivia national football team from 2002 to 2003. He was also part of Bolivia's squad for the 2001 Copa América tournament.

References

External links
 

1977 births
Living people
Bolivian footballers
Bolivia international footballers
Sportspeople from Santa Cruz de la Sierra
Association football defenders
Oriente Petrolero players
La Paz F.C. players
C.D. Jorge Wilstermann players
Club Deportivo Guabirá footballers
Bolivian football managers
C.D. Vaca Díez managers
Real Santa Cruz managers